Sonsorol  is one of the sixteen states of Palau.  The inhabitants speak Sonsorolese, a local Chuukic language, and Palauan.

The islands of the state of Sonsorol, together with the islands of Hatohobei, form the Southwest Islands of Palau.

History
The first sighting by Europeans of the Sonsorols, was that of Sonsorol and Fanna by the Spanish ship Trinidad then commanded by Gonzalo Gómez de Espinosa on 6 May 1522. These two were collectively charted as the San Juan (St. John)  Islands as they were sighted on the day of its festivity. A Spanish missionary expedition commanded by Sargento Mayor Francisco Padilla arrived on Sonsorol on 30 November 1710, coming from Manila aboard the patache Santísima Trinidad. In 1712 they were explored by an expedition commanded by Spanish naval officer Bernardo de Egoy.

In 1899 Spain decided to sell the islands to the German Empire, which lost control over the territory in World War I, when Japan took over. The United States took possession of the area at the end of World War II and controlled it until Palau's independence.

During December 2012, the state suffered severely from Typhoon Bopha and people were evacuated to Akebesang in Koror. There were 37 people from Sonsorol, 19 from Pulo Anna, and ywo from Merir. A couple of months later, and due to a government decision, only Sonsorol was re-inhabited, as it cheaper and closer to get to and send supplies to. Forty-two people returned to the island, and it is the only inhabited island in the state as of 2014.

Geography 
The administrative center, and only village, is Dongosaru on Sonsorol island. The state has a total area of  distributed among several islands.

Islands

The state is subdivided into four municipalities, which correspond to the four individual islands that previously were inhabited. The islands are, from north to south (Fanna Island and Sonsorol Island are together called Sonsorol Islands):

Fanna 

The island is thickly wooded with coconut palms and other trees. The island is referenced as a municipality. Mariano Carlos served as chief from 2000 until the Typhoon Bopha evacuation.

Sonsorol 

The village of Dongosaro, which is the capital of the state, is located on the west coast. The island is thickly wooded with coconut palms and other trees. Together with Fanna, it forms the Sonsorol Islands.

Sonsorol was probably the first of Palau Islands visited by a European - the Jesuit expedition of Francisco Padilla on 30 November 1710. A year after Typhoon Bopha, the Palau government issued a reconstruction plan for the island, and also built a small dock there.

Pulo Anna 

A village named Puro was once on the northwest side of the island. Pulo Anna lies in the flow of the Equatorial Countercurrent throughout the year.

Merir

A village named Melieli, which had a radio station, was located on the northwest side of the island.

Demography 
The population of the state was 40 in the 2015 census and the median age was 30.0 years. The official languages of the state are Palauan, English, and Sonsorolese. Nurap is the title of the traditional high chief from the state.

Political system
The state of Sonsorol, with population of less than 50, has an elected chief executive, governor. The state also has a legislature elected every four years. The state population elects one of the members of the House of Delegates of Palau.

Education
The Ministry of Education operates two public schools in the state:
 Pulo Anna Elementary School - Built in 1972, it has one classroom and one teacher, with facilities for its students (five, as of September 2018) to stay on the otherwise deserted island
 Sonsorol Elementary School - Established in 1972, it has one classroom and one teacher, to serve the students (thirteen, as of September 2018) who already live on the island

References

External links
Sonsorol Island
Municipalities with Chiefs mentioned
Satellite views
Sailing Directions
Atoll Research Bulletin 267
Honorary Consulate of the Republic of Palau to the UK &NI
Constitution of the State of Sonsorol

 
States of Palau
Islands of Palau